Joseph-Émile Dubreuil (December 15, 1894 – September 29, 1959) was a Canadian provincial politician.

Born in Montreal, Quebec, Dubreuil was the member of the Legislative Assembly of Quebec for Montréal–Jeanne-Mance from 1939 to 1948.

References

1894 births
1959 deaths
Politicians from Montreal
Quebec Liberal Party MNAs
Burials at Notre Dame des Neiges Cemetery